Buda is a commune in Buzău County, Muntenia, Romania, located in the vicinity of the Carpathian Mountains. It is composed of seven villages: Alexandru Odobescu, Buda, Dănulești, Mucești-Dănulești, Spidele, Toropălești and Valea Largă.

References

Communes in Buzău County
Localities in Muntenia